Paul the Silentiary, also known as Paulus Silentiarius (died AD 575–580), was a Greek Byzantine poet and courtier to the emperor Justinian at Constantinople.

Life 
What little we know of Paul's life comes largely from the contemporary historian and poet Agathias, a friend and admirer, who describes him as coming from a rich and illustrious family, with a father, Cyrus, and a grandfather, Florus, who both probably held public office.

Paul also entered public life and became a silentiary – one of a group of 30 court officials of privileged backgrounds organised under three officers (decurions) whose first duty was maintaining order and silence in the Great Palace of Constantinople. They also fulfilled important commissions, especially in church matters, and by the sixth century their order had attained the social rank of illustris, the highest in the late empire. Paul himself may have risen to become their chief (primicerius). He died some time between 575 and 580.

Works

Agathias considered Paul's greatest work to be his long verse ecphrasis of Justinian's Cathedral of the Holy Wisdom (Hagia Sophia), composed after the reconstruction of the dome in 562/3. Paul sees the church as a "meadow" of many-coloured kinds of marble, and helps us to imagine the church before its many subsequent remodellings. The poem was probably commissioned by Justinian himself, with verses to be recited by Paul himself during the rededication ceremony. The panegyric consists of 1029 verses in Greek, starting with 134 lines of iambic trimeter, with the remainder in dactylic hexameter.

Of his other poems, some eighty epigrams in the classical tradition have been preserved in the Greek Anthology. Forty of these are love poems. Two are replies to poems by Agathias. In another Paul laments the death of Damocharis of Cos, Agathias's favourite pupil. J. A. Symonds calls these verses "the last autumnal blossoms on the tree of Greek beauty." Although his subject matter is varied, much is explicitly erotic and uses Pagan imagery, as in the following example:

I press her breasts, our mouths are joined, and I feed in unrestrained fury round her silver neck, but not yet is my conquest complete; I still toil wooing a maiden who refuses me her bed. Half of herself she has given to Aphrodite and half to Pallas, and I waste away between the two.

Bibliography

Texts and translations 
 [Greek texts with facing German translation]
 [Greek texts]
Bell, Peter Neville, ed. (2009) [https://www.worldcat.org/oclc/318874086 Three Political Voices from the Age of Justinian: Agapetus, 'Advice to the Emperor'; Dialogue on Political Science'; Paul the Silentiary, 'Description of Hagia Sophia''']. Liverpool: Liverpool University Press   [English translation and commentary]
The Greek Anthology I (Loeb Classical Library) translated by W. R. Paton (1916) Cambridge MA: Harvard UP; London: Heinemann) [Original Greek with facing page English translations]

 Secondary literature 
 [Greek texts with Italian translation]
 [English translations only]
"Paulus Silentiarius", William Smith (ed.) Dictionary of Greek and Roman Biography and Mythology. Vol. III (London, 1870)
Symonds, J. A. (1876) Studies of the Greek Poets''. Vol. II (New York: Harper and Brothers, 1880)

Notes

Further reading

External links
Paul the Silentiary: The Magnificence of Hagia Sophia at The Internet Medieval Sourcebook
Extracts of his eulogy of the Hagia Sophia

Greek male poets
6th-century Greek poets
6th-century deaths
Epigrammatists of the Greek Anthology
Ministers of Justinian I
6th-century Byzantine writers
Byzantine poets

Year of birth unknown

Year of death uncertain